Cristina Lago (born January 10, 1982), is a Brazilian cinema and television actress. She played the lead role in five movies.

Filmography

Film

Television

Teatro

References

External links 
 

1982 births
Living people
Brazilian actresses
Brazilian stage actresses
People from Foz do Iguaçu